Vale Recreation F.C. is a football club which was formed in 1932 by Wilfred J. Corbet and is based in the Channel Island of Guernsey.

The club is affiliated to the Guernsey Football Association and plays in its leagues; the club has won the top league, the FNB Priaulx League, on thirteen occasions, making them the third most successful club. In the Upton Park Trophy they have one of the worst records in the Channel Islands, losing eleven of the fifteen finals they have reached. They also compete in the Reserve Division, called the Jackson League, as well as in the Railway League (third team) and the Veterans League (over 35s).

The club is one of the few Channel Islands clubs to have competed in the FA Vase, competing in the four seasons from 1987 to 1991; in 1987/1988 they got to the fourth round, the best ever by a Channel Island club until Guernsey FC reached the semi-final in 2012/13.

Teams and FA Status

The club consists of a senior first team (Priaulx League) and reserve team (Jackson League), third/ fourth teams (Railway League Div 1 & Div 2), a veterans' team and junior teams for Under 18s, Under 16s, Under 14s,Under 13s and Under 12s.

Vale Recreation has achieved the Football Association's Charter Standard Development status which is awarded when a club is able to demonstrate that it meets the FA's criteria as to playing programme; child protection; sports equity and ethics and club management. Through their Standard Development status they are able provide opportunities for players from the age of five to receive coaching and competition in junior and senior men's and ladies' football. Coaching is by qualified coaches who are trained and have been screened for their suitability for working with young people.

2015/16 Vale Rec finished 3rd in the Priaulx League and won the Stanger Cup 3–1 versus Rovers AC at the Corbet Field. They also reached cup semi-finals in the Wheway Cup (Jersey) losing 3–1 to Sylvans, the Jeremie Cup losing 2–1 to Trinity (Jersey) and the Le Riches Cup (Jersey) losing 2–0 to Trinity.

2016/17 Vale Rec lost the Rawlinson Cup 3–2 to Sylvans at the Cycling Ground.

Colours and badge
Vale Recreation FC's home colours are yellow shirts, green shorts and yellow socks. They used to play in Gold shirts, but Gold coloured shirts proved too difficult to get hold of. Their change kit is white shirts, green shorts and white socks.

The Vale Recreation FC badge has a green background with a white "VR" for the club's initials. The current sponsors of the team are Marks and Spencers.

Stadium
The team plays its home games at Corbet Field, a 3,000 capacity dual-use sports facility in St Sampson, Guernsey. The ground is also used for Flat Green Bowls by Vale Recreation Bowls Club.

Honours

Former players
The club has produced four players who have gone on to play professionally or semi-professionally, Matthew Le Tissier also played International football for England and Ryan-Zico Black played under 21 for Northern Ireland

 Ryan-Zico Black
 Matthew Le Tissier
 Lee Luscombe
 Chris Tardif

References

External links
 Official website

 
Association football clubs established in 1932
Football clubs in Guernsey
1932 establishments in Guernsey